Sennet may refer to:

 USS Sennet (SS-408)
 Sennet, the predecessor of the London Student
 Northern sennet and Southern sennet, two species of barracuda

See also
 Cynet (disambiguation)
 Senet
 Senate